Carabus menetriesi is a species of beetle from family Carabidae, found in Austria, Belarus, Bulgaria, Czech Republic, Finland, Italy, Poland, Russia, Slovakia, and Ukraine, and the Baltic states. They are black coloured.

References

menetriesi
Beetles of Europe
Beetles described in 1827
Taxa named by Arvid David Hummel